Jan Czuwara (born 18 October 1995) is a Polish handball player for RK Vardar 1961 and the Polish national team.

He represented Poland at the 2020 European Men's Handball Championship.

Honors 
 Macedonian Handball Super League
 Winner: 2022
 Macedonian Handball Cup
 Winner: 2022

References

External links

1995 births
Living people
People from Dzierżoniów
Polish male handball players
21st-century Polish people